Song of Life may refer to:

Film
The Song of Life (1922 film), an American silent film
Song of Life (Píseň života), a 1924 film starring Adolf Krössing
The Song of Life (1926 film), a German silent film
The Song of Life (1931 film), a German film
Bhikharan or Song of Life, a 1935 Indian Hindi film
The Song of Life (1945 film), an Italian film

Literature
Song of Life, a 1927 short-story collection by Fannie Hurst
"Song of Life", a 1970 poem by Huang Xiang; see Century Mountain
The Song of Life, a 1920 book by W. H. Davies
The Song of Life, a 1913 short story by William J. Locke
The Song of Life and Other Poems, a book by Vinayaka Krishna Gokak; see 1947 in poetry
Cîntul vieții (The Song of Life), a 1950 book by Alexandru Toma
Ernst von Dohnányi: A Song of Life, a biography of Ernst von Dohnányi by Iona von Dohnányi

Music
Levenslied (lit. "life song" or "song about life"), a Dutch-language type of popular music
Songs of Life Festival

Classical music
Gesang des Lebens (Song of Life), a 1914 choral composition by Joseph Marx
Gesang des Lebens, op.29 (Song of Life), a 1910 choral composition by Richard Wetz
Song of Life, a composition by Lora Aborn
Song of Life, a tone poem by Frederick Grant Gleason
Song of Life, a 2007 chamber piece for solo violin by Matthew Hindson
The Song of Life, a 1995 cantata by Ivo Petrić

Albums
 Songs of Life (Bret Michaels album) or the title song, 2003
 Songs of Life (The Gufs album) or the title song, "Song of Life", 1992
 Song of Life, by Libera, 2012

Popular songs
"Song of Life" (song), a 1992 song by Leftfield
"Song of Life", from the film The Outsiders II, 2004
"Song of Life", from the video game  Project DIVA, 2009
"The Song of Life", by Eluveitie from Spirit, 2006
"The Song of Life (La-La-La)", by Minnie Ripperton from Love Lives Forever, 1980

Religion
Shir Hayim ("Song of Life") a Reform Jewish synagogue in London, England